Asagena semideserta is a species of cobweb spider in the family Theridiidae. It is found in Kazakhstan and Mongolia.

References

Theridiidae
Spiders described in 2005
Spiders of Asia